The Houston Parks and Recreation Department (HPARD) operates and maintains the City of Houston's parks, playgrounds, swimming pools, golf courses, skateparks, and recreation centers; as well as, providing recreational programming. HPARD currently oversees "382 developed parks and more than 167 greenspaces", covering over 39,500 acres; and over 125 miles of hike-and-bike trails.

The HPARD consists of seven (7) divisions:
 The Director’s Office
 Recreation and Wellness Division
 Greenspace Management 
 Facilities Management and Development
 Management and Finance
 Urban Park Rangers and Safety, and
 Communications

History 
The Department of Public Parks was created on March 15, 1916 by a City of Houston ordinance (Chapter 23, Article 1, Section 32-2).  At that time, the department had two parks — Sam Houston Park and Hermann Park.

In 2008, the department received national accreditation from the National Recreation and Park Association’s (NRPA) Commission for Accreditation of Park and Recreation Agencies (CAPRA).

As of 2021, the department has: 
 Budget: $69 milllion
 Employees: 708 full time
 Facilities
 Developed Parks: 382
 Greenspaces: 160
 Acres: 39,000+

References

External Links 

 

 

Government of Houston